Kadazan Dusun Murut Malaysia Football Club or KDMM FC is a Malaysian football club based in Keningau, Sabah. Founded in 2016, the club's home ground since then has been Keningau Stadium in Keningau. The club represents the Kadazan-Dusun and Murut ethnics community in Malaysian football competitions. The club currently do not play in any league.

History
Kadazan Dusun Murut Malaysia Football Club was founded in 2016 by its owner Peter Anthony as part of its effort to bring the ethnics unity together through the sports of football. It also served as a platform to bring a positive image among the ethnics and as part of football grassroots development within the club. The club was accepted to play in 2016 Malaysia FAM League and has finished the league in fourth place and compete for the quarter-final playoff qualification to Malaysia Premier League.

For second season in the third-tier league, the 2017 Malaysia FAM League, the club only retained half of the old squad and has held a trial session around Sabah for new recruits.

Stadium
KDMM FC play their home matches in the 10,000 capacity Keningau Stadium in Keningau while the club will play their first participation in FA Cup home matches in Likas Stadium.

Players

First-team squad

Transfers
For recent transfers, see List of Malaysian football transfers 2017 and List of Malaysian football transfers summer 2016

Coaches

Management team

Club personnel

 Chairman: Datuk Peter Anthony
 Manager: Henry Soimpon
 Assistant Manager: Ebby Roy Raimon
 Head coach: Andrew Majanggim
 Assistant head coach: Silvester Sindih
 Fitness Coach: Jorrye Jakiwa
 Goalkeeping coach: Austin Orou
 Coach: Rizal Awang Jad
 Physio: James Edwin

References

External links
 Official Facebook Page

Malaysia FAM League clubs
Football clubs in Malaysia